Elections to Northampton Borough Council were held on 5 May 2011. The whole council was up for election and the Liberal Democrats Lost overall control of the council to the Conservative Party. There was no General Election taking place at the same time.

Election result

There were significant changes to the borough council in 2011 compared to the 2007 Borough election so that it is not possible to record all gains and losses. There were 45 seats in 2011 compared to 47 in 2007 with many changes to individual seats.

|}

Ward results

The number in brackets after the ward name is the number of councillors to be elected. An asterisk after the name (*) indicate the candidate was elected. Candidates are list in order of number of votes. 'Turnout' indicates the number of ballot papers issued followed by the percentage of registered voters voting. Votes could be cast for 1 up to 3 candidates in some cases, though voting for more than the specified number would disqualify the ballot paper. Several wards were changed in 2011 from those in 2007 - it is therefore not possible to indicate all gains and holds in some cases.

2011 English local elections
2011
2010s in Northamptonshire